Electric Youth is a Canadian synth-pop duo from Toronto, Ontario consisting of Bronwyn Griffin (vocals, songwriter) and Austin Garrick (producer, songwriter, synthesizer, drums).

Career
Garrick and Griffin have been dating since the 8th grade. Their initial breakthrough came in 2011 when their song "A Real Hero", created in association with College, was prominently featured in the movie Drive. The song was written by Garrick, in part about Chesley Sullenberger and the crash landing of Flight 1549. "A Real Hero" was nominated for a 2012 MTV Movie Award in the category of "Best Music".

Spin magazine named "A Real Hero" one of the 20 Best Songs of 2011.

Contrary to some reports in the press, the group did not name themselves after Electric Youth, the 1989 album by pop singer Debbie Gibson. Garrick explained to Rolling Stone magazine about the group's sound: 

In late 2013 Electric Youth signed with Last Gang Records and Secretly Canadian. On September 30, 2014 the band released their debut album "Innerworld" through Last Gang Records in Canada and Secretly Canadian in the rest of the world, debuting at #13 on the Billboard Top Dance Electronic Albums chart. "Innerworld" was produced by Electric Youth. Vince Clarke (Erasure/Yazoo/Depeche Mode) and Peter Mayes (PNAU/Empire of the Sun) provided additional production, and the album was mixed by Mayes.  "Innerworld" includes previously released tracks 'The Best Thing' and 'A Real Hero (feat College)'  It received wide critical acclaim including NME and NPR First Listen.

Rolling Stone declared Electric Youth one of the Ten Artists You Need To Know in 2014.

Electric Youth carried out their first headlining tour across the US and Canada in November, 2014.

In 2019 Electric Youth released their second studio album “Memory Emotion”, receiving a Juno Award nomination for Electronic Album of the Year.

Discography
Studio albums
Innerworld (2014) (Secretly Canadian/Last Gang)
Breathing (Original Motion Picture Soundtrack from a Lost Film) (2017) (Milan)
Memory Emotion (2019) (Watts Arcade Inc./Last Gang)
Come True (Original Motion Picture Soundtrack) (2021) (Sony Music)

Singles/EPs
Runaway (2014) (Secretly Canadian/Last Gang)
A Real Hero with College (2012) (Watts Arcade)
Right Back to You (2011) (Watts Arcade)

References

External links

Electric Youth on YouTube

Canadian synthpop groups
Synthwave groups
Musical groups from Toronto
Musical groups established in 2011
2011 establishments in Ontario
Secretly Canadian artists